KBOI may refer to:

 KBOI (AM), a radio station (670 AM) licensed to Boise, Idaho, United States
 KBOI-FM, a radio station (93.1 AM) licensed to New Plymouth, Idaho
 KBOI-TV, a television station (channel 28 digital/2 virtual) licensed to Boise, Idaho
 KQFC, a radio station (97.9 FM) licensed to Boise, Idaho, which used the call sign KBOI-FM from 1960 to 1985
 Boise Airport (ICAO code KBOI)